Jurica Pranjić (born 16 December 1987 in Teslić) is a Croatian football player, currently playing for NK Borac Bobota.

Career
Pranjić started his career at Osijek, was on loan at Belišće and spent a short time in Hungary with Vasas. After being out of the game for almost the whole of 2012, he signed up with Slaven Belupo in December 2012. Pranjić returned to Osijek in June 2014, then had a stint at Austrian third level outfit SV Oberwart.

References

External links
 

1987 births
Living people
People from Teslić
Association football defenders
Croatian footballers
Croatia youth international footballers
NK Osijek players
NK Belišće players
Vasas SC players
NK Slaven Belupo players
NK Olimpija Osijek players
Croatian Football League players
Nemzeti Bajnokság I players
Austrian Regionalliga players
Croatian expatriate footballers
Expatriate footballers in Hungary
Croatian expatriate sportspeople in Hungary
Expatriate footballers in Austria
Croatian expatriate sportspeople in Austria